Talkomatic was an online chat system that facilitates real-time text communication among a small group of people. Each participant in Talkomatic has their own section of the screen, broadcasting messages letter-by-letter as they are typed. This interaction is dissimilar from present-day chat systems and is based upon work done in 1973 at the University of Illinois on the PLATO system by Doug Brown and David R. Woolley. This work is part of a conservation effort aimed at preserving historically significant works and their descendants. The original Talkomatic can be seen operating as it did in the 1970s on the CYBIS system operated by cyber1.org.

History 
The original Talkomatic was the first multi-user online chat system, with the possible exception of the Party Line function of the Emergency Management Information Systems And Reference Index (EMISARI) system, created for the US Office of Emergency Preparedness by Murray Turoff in 1971. Talkomatic was created by Doug Brown and David R. Woolley in 1973 on the PLATO System at the University of Illinois. It offered six channels (the analog of a "room"), which could each hold up to five participants. Along with PLATO Notes and a wide variety of games, Talkomatic was one of the features of PLATO that gave rise to a large online community that persisted into the mid 1980s.

Ray Ozzie's smartphone app, Talko (launched in September 2014 and acquired, and dissolved by Microsoft in 2016), is named after Talkomatic, which Ozzie experienced while working on the PLATO System in the 1970s.

Web version 
On March 11, 2014, Brown and Woolley released a new version of Talkomatic designed for the web. Intended to be a reinterpretation of its 1970s namesake, it is conceptually similar to the original system, but limitations imposed by the resource constraints of the time (such as the maximum room count) have been lifted.

Revival of original concepts 
Features of the original work included public, private and semi-private spaces which enabled five concurrent "chatters" to communicate in accordance with their privacy needs.

By the end of 2017, Talkomatic was in its third version and supported the original's features of Public and Private rooms but work on the final feature, Semi-Private rooms had not been implemented.

On March 11, 2018, Version 4 was released, completing the features of the original version with some enhancements in support of the greater variety of modern-day browsers and display resolutions. With this final addition, a feature was added to address the problems arising from truly anonymous access.

Enabling anonymity 
The original Talkomatic evolved in the PLATO community which was largely limited by the constraints of requiring credentials used to access the PLATO system. The system recognized different types of users: authors, instructors, students and multiples. These users were managed as "groups" and the owners of those groups provided the administrative oversight necessary if user conduct was deemed inappropriate by others. At the discretion of a group owner, credentials could be suspended or revoked entirely. The most anonymous of the credential types, multiples, could be prevented from accessing the Talkomatic system, thus preventing any type of anonymous access.

Talkomatic (Web version) was designed to be freely available for use by anyone but complete anonymity invited abuse. The Version 4 solution was to implement an in-room voting system for rooms holding three or more participants. Participants who deemed the conduct of another to be inappropriate could "vote-down" the offending user. If a participant's conduct is deemed inappropriate by more than half of the participants, the offending participant is ejected from the room.

In addition to Brown and Woolley's original domain (talko.cc), Ray Ozzie donated three other domains to the conservation efforts. In 2018, Talkomatic was available at talko.cc, talkomatic.com, talkomatic.org, and talkomatic.net.

References

External links 
 Talkomatic website

Internet culture
Online chat
Chat websites